Robert Harvey Bawden (28 February 1917 – 22 July 1980) was an Australian rules footballer who played with Richmond in the Victorian Football League (VFL) during the early 1940s.

Bawden originally played with Leongatha Imperials Football Club and was a member of their 1932 and Leongatha FC's 1934 and 1935 premiership teams.

In 1935, Bawden played 16 games with Victorian Football Association (VFA) club Oakleigh. He returned to Morwell and played in their premiership and won the 1937 Rodda Memorial Gold Medal in the Central Gippsland Football Association before joining Richmond in 1939. 

Over the course of his career there Bawden acted as second ruckman to Richmond great Jack Dyer. When not rucking he was used in the forward pocket and was a member of Richmond's 1943 VFL premiership team. He also participated in three losing VFL Grand Finals, in 1940, 1942 and 1944.

From 1946 onwards for a few years he played for City and then Cornwall in the Northern Tasmanian Football Association (NTFA).

He was the brother of Essendon player, Tom Bawden.

References

External links

Bob Bawden's Tigerland Archive Profile

1917 births
Australian rules footballers from Victoria (Australia)
Richmond Football Club players
Richmond Football Club Premiership players
Oakleigh Football Club players
Morwell Football Club players
1980 deaths
East Launceston Football Club players
One-time VFL/AFL Premiership players